This is a list of the 73 members of the European Parliament for Italy in the 2014 to 2019 session.

List

Party representation

References 

Italy
List
2009